Ayesha Omar (born 12 October 1981) is a Pakistani actress and YouTuber. Considered as a style icon in her home country, Omar is one of the most popular and highest-paid actresses of Pakistan.

In 2012, she released her first singles "Chalte Chalte" and "Khamoshi" which, although a commercial success in Pakistan, was met with a mixed reaction from critics. Omar went on to win Lux Style Award for Best Album. She made her film debut in the lead role with successful romantic-comedy Karachi Se Lahore in 2015, followed by supporting characters in war film Yalghaar (2017) and the drama Kaaf Kangana (2019).

Early life and education 
Omar was born in Lahore. She was one year old when her father died and her mother raised Omar and her brother as a single parent. She described her childhood as ''tough'' and ''independent''. She attended Lahore Grammar School, and went to the National College of Arts for her Bachelors and Masters qualifications. While in school and college, she participated in co-curricular activities and learnt dance through theatre plays.

Career

Modeling 
Omar started her career as a model. She has done many commercials, including for Kurkure, Harpic, Capri, Pantene and Zong. Omar first hosted the show Meray Bachpan Kay Din on PTV at the age of eight. She then hosted Morning show Yeh Waqt Hai Mera on CNBC Pakistan, Rhythm on Prime TV and Hot chocolate on ARY Zauq. In 2018, she attended the New York Fashion Week as Pakistan's representative for the beauty brand Maybelline New York.

Acting 

Omar made her acting debut with the serial College Jeans, which aired on PTV. Following this, she appeared in Geo TV's drama serial Dolly Ki Ayegi Baraat alongside veteran actors like Bushra Ansari, Saba Hameed and Jawed Sheikh. Since 2009, she appears on popular sitcom Bulbulay as Khoobsurat, opposite actor Nabeel. Bulbulay become the most watched sitcom of Pakistan. Following the success of Bulbulay, Omar received strong media coverage and became a household name. Its second season currently airs on ARY Digital.

Omar then appeared in PTV serial Dil Ko Manana Aya Nahi opposite Amanat Ali, and Geo TV's drama serial Ladies Park alongside Humayun Saeed, Azfar Rehman, Hina Dilpazeer and Mahnoor Baloch.

In 2012, she was seen in Hum TV's highly successful romantic-drama serial Zindagi Gulzar Hai. She portrayed Sara, a girl with grey shades. In the serial, she played the role of on-screen sister of Fawad Khan. In an interview with The News International, she commented: ''Fawad I’ve known since I was in college. We were part of the same underground music scene in Lahore – he was with EP and I was with my college band. We’ve spent some great times and practically grown up together. He was always very cute and very talented. But no, I can never think of him ‘that’ way and I didn’t mind playing his sister at all.''

In 2013, she played the main antagonist called Arzoo in Tanhai on Hum TV. The show was a success.

She was also seen in Geo Kahani's serial Soha or Savera and Hum TV's serial Woh Chaar. Apart from television, she also performed item songs in Pakistani films Love Mein Ghum and Main Hoon Shahid Afridi, both of which were commercially successful.

After becoming an established actress of Pakistani television, Omar stepped into film industry in lead role with Wajahat Rauf's road drama film Karachi Se Lahore, in which she was paired opposite Shehzad Sheikh. Upon release, the film received generally mixed reviews from critics. The Express Tribune criticized Omar's appearance in the movie and wrote: ''There was barely anything for Ayesha Omar in the script, which is why her performance doesn't get noticed more than a girl wearing a revealing top, in a jeep flooded by guys. Even her item number Tutti Fruity was a touch jittery and certainly not worth the hype.'' Although Karachi Se Lahore was not critically well-received, it surprisingly came out as a major box office success, with a total earning of 10 Crore (US$1.0 million) worldwide.

Omar continued to act in television plays after signing few films, and made episodic appearances on Mr. Shamim and Kitni Girhain Baaki Hain 2.

Her next film release was Yalghaar in 2017, in which she played the intense character of Zarmina. Dawn.com describes her character as, ''Even more elusive is Ayesha Omar's purpose on the set. She plays a bride who is kidnapped from her wedding ceremony by Tor Jan (Humayun Saeed) and his terrorists. Her role, if any, is to grieve constantly and have Tor Jan whisper philosophical sayings into her ear. Yalghaar is among the most expensive Pakistani films ever made and the cost of waterproof makeup on Ayesha Omar's ashen face coupled with an endless cascade of fake tears, have surely contributed their share.'' Despite having an ensemble cast including Shaan, Humayun Saeed, Adnan Siddiqui among others, the film failed to garner a high score at box office, and collected around a total income of 200 million (US$1.9 million), which was called disappointing as compared to its big budget.

In 2018, Omar made a special appearance in film Saat Din Mohabbat In opposite Sheheryar Munawar, which was released in June 2018. Speaking about the film in a press statement, Omar commented: ''I said yes to the movie as soon as I read the script. I absolutely loved the concept of the movie as it is a complete entertainer with a pinch of both comedy and romance.'' The film was a box office success.

In 2019, she played a supporting character in the romantic-drama film Kaaf Kangana, directed by Khalil-ur-Rehman Qamar. Haiya Bokhari of Dawn.com noted, ''Omar's character, though brief in its screen-time provides some relief, both aesthetically compared to odious styling featured in the rest of the film and in terms of acting and dialogue. Her natural effervescence shines through bringing some respite to sore eyes.'' The film emerged as a box office bomb.

Music 
Omar first sang the song "Man Chala Hai" for her commercial Capri. Then she sang the song "Bhooli Yaadon Mein", title song of her serial Ladies Park and "Manjali" title song of Geo TV serial Manjali. She also sang the songs "Aoa" and "Tu Hi Hai".

In 2012, Omar released two albums "Chalte Chalte" and "Khamoshi" for which she won the Lux Style Award for Best Album, and in 2013 she released her third album "Gimme Gimme". In 2013, she gave her voice for an old classical song named "Laage Re Nain" and another fusion song "Miyan Ki Malhar" for Coke Studio Pakistan (Season 6).

Painting 
A Fine Arts graduate from NCA, she said that, even before acting and modelling, painting and singing were her first passions and career choices.

Personal life 
In December 2015, Ayesha Omar and her co-star Azfar Rehman met with a road accident. The actors were reportedly travelling from Karachi to Hyderabad when the accident occurred. According to a source, another vehicle collided into their car, causing the car to swerve off the road and fall into a ditch. After recovering from injury, Omar told media: ''My entire life flashed in front of my eyes as I held onto my seat waiting to be hit by a truck.''

In a 2020 interview with Ahsan Khan on his show Bol Nights with Ahsan Khan, Omar revealed that she has also been a victim of sexual harassment, stating: ''I have been through harassment in my career and life, so I understand how it feels. I don’t have the courage to talk about it yet, maybe someday I will. But I can totally relate with everyone who has been through it.''

Filmography

Film

Television

Reality shows

Discography

Awards and nominations 

! Ref
|-
! style="background:#bfd7ff" colspan="5"|Lux Style Awards
|-
|2008
|Kaisa Yeh Junoon
|Best Television Actress (Satellite)
|
|
|-
|2013
|Khamoshi|Best Album of the Year 
|
|
|-
! style="background:#bfd7ff" colspan="5"|ARY Film Awards
|-
|rowspan="2"|2016
|rowspan="2"|Karachi Se Lahore''
|ARY Film Award for Best Actress
|
|rowspan="2"|
|-
|ARY Film Award for Best Star Debut Female
|
|-
! style="background:#bfd7ff" colspan="5"|International Pakistan Prestige Awards
|-
|2017
|colspan="2"|Style Icon of the Year Female
|
|
|}

See also 
 List of Pakistani actresses

References

External links 

 

21st-century Pakistani actresses
Living people
National College of Arts alumni
Actresses in Urdu cinema
Pakistani female models
Pakistani film actresses
Pakistani television actresses
Pakistani television hosts
Pakistani women journalists
Punjabi people
People from Lahore
ARY Digital people
1981 births
21st-century Pakistani women singers
Women television journalists
Pakistani women television presenters
Lahore Grammar School alumni
Pakistani YouTubers
Coke Studio (Pakistani TV program)